Lac-Boisbouscache is an unorganized territory in the Canadian province of Quebec, located in the Les Basques Regional County Municipality.

Demographics

Population

See also
 List of unorganized territories in Quebec

References

Incorporated places in Bas-Saint-Laurent